Antonio Negro (born 10 June 1998) is an Italian footballer who plays as a forward for Foligno.

Club career

Napoli 
Negro joined the Napoli football academy in 2012 from ADS Recale 2002.

Loan to Latina 
On 31 January 2017, Negro was signed by Serie B club Latina on a 6-month loan deal. On 13 May, Negro made his professional debut for Latina in Serie B as a substitute replacing Riccardo Maciucca in the 75th minute of a 2–2 draw against Perugia. On 18 May he played his second match for Latina, against as a substitute, replacing Roberto Insigne in the 56th minute of a 2–1 away defeat against Avellino. Negro ended his 6-month loan to Latina with only 2 appearances, both as a substitute.

Loan to Paganese 
On 17 July 2017, Negro was loaned to Serie C side Paganese on a season-long loan deal. On 30 July he made his debut for Paganese in a 6–0 away defeat against Trapani in the first round of Coppa Italia, he played the entire match. On 26 August, Negro made his Serie C debut for Paganese in a 2–0 home defeat against Bisceglie, he was replaced by Giuliano Regolanti in the 55th minute. Negro ended his season-long loan to Paganese with only 7 appearances, only 1 as a starter.

Pontedera
On 26 July 2019, he signed with Pontedera.

Foligno
On 4 January 2020, he joined Serie D club Foligno.

International career
Negro represented the Italy national under-16 football team in 2014.

Career statistics

Club

References

External links
 Negro Latina Profile
 
 
 

1998 births
People from Marcianise
Living people
Italian footballers
Italy youth international footballers
Association football forwards
Latina Calcio 1932 players
Paganese Calcio 1926 players
U.S. Città di Pontedera players
A.S.D. Città di Foligno 1928 players
A.S.D. Football Club Matese players
Serie B players
Serie C players
Serie D players
Footballers from Campania
Sportspeople from the Province of Caserta